The Willam–Warnke yield criterion  is a function that is used to predict when failure will occur in concrete and other cohesive-frictional materials such as rock, soil, and ceramics.  This yield criterion has the functional form

There are three material parameters ( - the uniaxial compressive strength,  – the uniaxial tensile strength,  - the equibiaxial compressive strength) that have to be determined before the Willam-Warnke yield criterion may be applied to predict failure.  

The function  can be interpreted as the friction angle which depends on the Lode angle. The quantity  is interpreted as a cohesion pressure. The Willam-Warnke yield criterion may therefore be viewed as a combination of the Mohr–Coulomb and the Drucker–Prager yield criteria.

Willam-Warnke yield function 

In the original paper, the three-parameter Willam-Warnke yield function was expressed as

The locus of the boundary of the stress surface in the deviatoric stress plane is expressed in polar coordinates by the quantity  which is given by 

where

The parameter  in the model is given by

The Haigh-Westergaard representation of the Willam-Warnke yield condition can be
written as

where

Modified forms of the Willam-Warnke yield criterion 

An alternative form of the Willam-Warnke yield criterion in Haigh-Westergaard coordinates is the Ulm-Coussy-Bazant form:

where

and 

The quantities  are interpreted as friction coefficients.

See also 
 Yield (engineering)
 Yield surface
 Plasticity (physics)

References 

 Chen, W. F. (1982). Plasticity in Reinforced Concrete. McGraw Hill. New York.

External links 
 Kaspar Willam and E.P. Warnke (1974). Constitutive model for the triaxial behavior of concrete
 Palko, J. L. (1993). Interactive reliability model for whisker-toughened ceramics
 The ‘‘Chunnel’’ Fire. I: Chemoplastic softening in rapidly heated concrete by Franz-Josef Ulm, Olivier Coussy, and Zdeneˇk P. Bazˇant.

Plasticity (physics)
Solid mechanics
Yield criteria